Live Action Toy Story is a 2012 comedy-adventure fan film produced by the Arizona-based Jonason Pauley and Jesse Perrotta; it is a shot-by-shot recreation of the 1995 computer-animated film of the same name, with the toy characters animated through stop-motion or filmed moving with wires and strings.

Plot
In a world where toys are living things but pretend to be lifeless when humans are present, a group of toys, owned by young Andy Davis, are caught off-guard when Andy's birthday party is moved up a week, as his family (including his mother and infant sister Molly) are preparing to move the following week. Andy's toys – including Bo Peep the shepherdess, Mr. Potato Head, Rex the dinosaur, Hamm the piggy bank and Slinky Dog – fear that they will be replaced by new toys from the birthday. Sheriff Woody – the toys' leader and Andy's favorite toy – sends out army men, led by Sarge, to spy on the party and report the gift results to the others with baby monitors. The toys are relieved when the party appears to end with none of them being replaced by new toys, but then Andy receives a surprise gift – a Buzz Lightyear action figure, who thinks that he is a real space ranger.

Buzz impresses the other toys with his various features, and Andy begins to favor him, making Woody feel outcast, compared to the newer, sleeker more advanced Buzz. As Andy prepares for a family outing at a restaurant called Pizza Planet, his mother allows him to bring one toy. Fearing that Andy will choose Buzz, Woody attempts to trap him behind a desk with RC, a radio-controlled car, but ends up accidentally knocking him out of a window. The other toys, except Bo Peep and Slinky, rebel against Woody, condemning him for stranding Buzz out of jealousy. Before they can exact revenge, Andy takes Woody and leaves for Pizza Planet. When the family stops for gas, Woody finds that Buzz has hitched a ride on their van. A fight breaks out which causes the two to fall out of the van and the family leaves without them. They manage to make their way to the restaurant by stowing away on a pizza delivery truck. Buzz gets them stuck in a crane game full of alien toys, where they are salvaged by Andy's neighbor Sid Phillips, a mean-spirited spoiled brat fond of torturing, destroying and incongruently customizing his toys.

While Woody attempts to escape from Sid's house, Buzz finally learns the hard way that he is a toy when he sees a Buzz Lightyear action figure television ad, and sinks into despondency after trying and failing to fly out the window. Sid plans to launch Buzz on a firework rocket, but his plans are delayed by a thunderstorm. Woody tells Buzz about the joy he can bring to Andy as a toy, restoring his confidence. So even as Woody despairs that he'll never be Andy's favorite again, to the point where he tells Buzz to just flat out go on without him, Buzz sets aside his rivalry with Woody and the two agree to get back to their owner. The next morning, Woody and Sid's mutant creature toys rescue Buzz just as Sid is about to launch the rocket and scare Sid into no longer abusing toys. Woody and Buzz leave just as Andy and his family drive away toward their new home.

The duo try to make it to the moving van, but Sid's dog, Scud, sees them and gives chase. Buzz ends up stranded while saving Woody from Scud, and Woody tries rescuing him with RC. Thinking that Woody is trying to get rid of RC as well, the other toys toss him off the truck. Having evaded Scud, Buzz and RC retrieve Woody as they continue to go after the truck. Upon seeing Woody and Buzz together on RC, the other toys realize their mistake and try to help them get back aboard, but RC's batteries become depleted, stranding them. Buzz realizes that Sid's rocket is still strapped to his back, and they ignite it, hurtling them toward the truck. Woody manages to throw RC back into the truck before he and Buzz soar into the air, and Buzz opens his wings to free himself from the rocket before it explodes, gliding with Woody to land safely into a box in the van, right next to Andy, who thinks they were in the car all along.

On Christmas Day, at their new house, Woody and Buzz stage another reconnaissance mission to prepare for the new toy arrivals. One of the toys is Mrs. Potato Head, much to Mr. Potato Head's delight. As Woody jokingly asks what could be worse than Buzz, they discover Andy's new gift is a puppy, and the two share a worried smile.

Production
Mesa, Arizona-based Jonason Pauley and Jesse Perrotta, both video makers with Perrotta having already created a series of puppet videos uploaded to YouTube named Billy and Chucky before Live Action Toy Story, became friends through a common interest in the Toy Story films during high school. The project began after the two viewed Toy Story 3 (2010), starting with a lunch room talk at school; they originally planned for one clip of Toy Story (1995) to be recreated, but later decided the entire film should be done.

Most of Live Action Toy Storys approximately $1,000 budget depended on loans from around 150 family members and friends from their church, some of whom also served as actors in the film.

Pauley's home served as the location for both Andy and Sid's rooms. Three places, two arcades in Mesa and Oregon and a Tempe Peter Piper Pizza restaurant, were the locations for Pizza Planet.

Live Action Toy Story was shot over the course of two years, with editing done during filming. The first six months of shooting was done on Saturdays and spent on the scenes that took place in Andy's room. By the summer of 2011 with school not in session and more friends available for collaboration, more scenes were filmed around the home and on the streets, with backgrounds of homes shot in neighborhoods close to them.

Live Action Toy Storys accuracy to the original film was extensive to the point where the license plate text was the same. Although toys of the main characters were already in possession by the two, other toys had to be purchased or even made. Sid's toys were produced out of parts of products they bought at a Goodwill store. The bull-terrier dog was hired from Craigslist. A major challenge when scouting locations in Arizona was making the settings look as similar to the typical California suburb look as possible, especially when it came to outdoor scenes.

According to Pauley, "I usually will say that the most difficult part was coordinating everyone’s schedule. But that’s not really a fun answer. It was frustrating when we lost part of the movie and had to reshoot a scene. As for the most fun, I was thrilled to move to different locations after being in Andy’s room for so long. The Pizza Planet and gas station scenes were fun to shoot." Also said Pauley, "Most of the time it was myself, Jesse, and whoever else we needed for the scene we were planning on filming. Our friends Amy and Kim, our actors TJ, Victor, Delani, the dog trainer, the guy who lent us a moving van, the list goes on. The whole thing took two years to film, and I edited as we went along."

Reception

To hype the project and get acquaintances on board to help, the production process was constantly documented on the film's Facebook page, and behind-the-scenes videos and a live-action recreation of the ending of Toy Story 3 were uploaded to YouTube.

In September 2011, Gizmodo published an article covering a sneak peek of the project uploaded to JP and Beyond.

The Toy Story 3 ending remake was covered by New York magazine's Vulture blog and the Pixar Times upon its May 2012 upload. Upon the trailer's August 2012 release, the two filmmakers were interviewed about the project on the nationally syndicated television program Right This Minute.

Upon its 2013 upload, Live Action Toy Story was covered by Boys' Life, The Verge, Collider, NBC News, Slate, Laughing Squid, MTV News, The Huffington Post, Gothamist, Wired, CNET, Vulture, NME, and The Hollywood Reporter which claimed it to be "a crown jewel in the fan-made tribute video community." It garnered more than 250,000 views in 24 hours and reached 1.7 million views within two days before surpassing the three million mark on its third day. Two weeks after its upload, the video had more than eight million views. It was tweeted about by Lee Unkrich on the day it was uploaded, describing it as done by a "VERY dedicated" team. As Fast Company journalist Joe Berkowitz described the film's appeal, "Although the strings controlling Woody and Buzz Lightyear may be visible in nearly every frame, you can also see the creators’ giddy affection for the source material, and for the craft of filmmaking in general."

Other sequels
Iowa brothers Morgan and Mason McGrew spent eight years recreating the film in stop motion. Titled Toy Story 3 in Real Life, the  film was shot using iPhones and was uploaded to YouTube on January 25, 2020. The shot-for-shot remake uses the film's original audio. According to Screen Crush, Pixar's parent company Walt Disney Studios gave the McGrews permission to release the film online.

References

External links
 Live Action Toy Story on YouTube
 

Fan films
Films released on YouTube
Pixar
2012 independent films
2012 films
Shot-for-shot remakes
Remakes of American films
2010s English-language films
2012 YouTube videos